The following is a list of notable deaths in January 2017.

Entries for each day are listed alphabetically by surname. A typical entry lists information in the following sequence:
 Name, age, country of citizenship at birth, subsequent country of citizenship (if applicable), reason for notability, cause of death (if known), and reference.

January 2017

1
Sir Tony Atkinson, 72, British economist, multiple myeloma.
Hilarion Capucci, 94, Syrian Melkite Catholic hierarch, Patriarchal Vicar of Jerusalem (1965–1974).
Jewel Plummer Cobb, 92, American biologist.
Bill Craig, 71, American swimmer, Olympic champion (1964), complications from pneumonia.
Yvon Dupuis, 90, Canadian politician.
Peter Farmer, 75, British set designer.
Karl Gerstner, 86, Swiss typographer.
Stuart Hamilton, 87, Canadian pianist, vocal coach and broadcaster, prostate cancer.
Aleksander Jackowski, 96, Polish anthropologist and ethnographer.
Jean Le Lan, 79, French cyclist.
Lorne Loomer, 79, Canadian rower, Olympic champion (1956).
Mel Lopez, 81, Filipino politician.
Bill Marshall, 77, Canadian film and theater producer, co-founder of the Toronto International Film Festival, cardiac arrest.
George Miller, 87, Scottish cricketer (national team).
Memo Morales, 79, Venezuelan singer, heart attack.
Moruca, 84, Spanish football player and coach (Racing de Santander).
Yaakov Neeman, 77, Israeli lawyer and politician, Minister of Justice (1996, 2009–2013) and Finance (1997–1998).
Emmanuel Niyonkuru, 54, Burundian politician, Senator (since 2015) and Minister of Water and Environment (since 2015), shot.
Derek Parfit, 74, English philosopher (Reasons and Persons).
Sir Jeremy Reilly, 82, British army general.
Abis Rizvi, 49, Indian businessman and film producer (Roar: Tigers of the Sundarbans), shot.
Samuel Schweber, 80, Argentinian chess player, International Master.
Jeremy Stone, 81, American scientist and arms control activist.
Aleksander Tšutšelov, 83, Estonian sailor, Olympic silver medalist (1960).
Talat Tunçalp, 101, Turkish Olympic racing cyclist (1936) and president of the Turkish Cycling Federation (1950–1968).
Abu Omar al-Turkistani, Chinese Islamist militant.
Bogdan Tuszyński, 84, Polish sports journalist and reporter (Polskie Radio).
Sylvester Uphus, 89, American politician, member of the Minnesota House of Representatives (1983–1993).
Robert Vallée, 94, French mathematician.
Alfonso Wong, 93, Hong Kong cartoonist (Old Master Q), organ failure.

2
Auriel Andrew, 69, Australian country singer.
René Ballet, 88, French journalist and author.
John Berger, 90, English art critic and painter.
Albert Brewer, 88, American politician, Governor of Alabama (1968–1971).
François Chérèque, 60, French labor unionist (CFDT), leukemia.
Ian Davison, 79, English cricketer (Nottinghamshire).
Barbara Fei, 85, Hong Kong opera singer.
Richard Gee, 83, Australian federal judge, Family Court (1980–1999), drowning.
Tom Harpur, 87, Canadian classicist, theologian, priest, and journalist.
Travis Hirschi, 81, American sociologist.
Richard Machowicz, 51, American Navy SEAL and television host (Future Weapons, Deadliest Warrior), brain cancer.
Daryl Spencer, 88, American baseball player (New York/San Francisco Giants, St. Louis Cardinals).
István Tatár, 58, Hungarian Olympic sprinter (1980, 1988).
Viktor Tsaryov, 85, Russian football player and coach (Dynamo Moscow, Soviet Union national team).
Jean Vuarnet, 83, French alpine skier, Olympic champion (1960), stroke.
Brian Widlake, 85, British broadcaster (The Money Programme).

3
Vida Alves, 88, Brazilian actress (Sua Vida Me Pertence), multiple organ failure.
Augusto Barreto, 93, Portuguese Olympic fencer (1952).
Enzo Benedetti, 85, Italian footballer (Palermo).
Rodney Bennett, 81, British television director (Doctor Who).
Martin Brandtner, 78, American Marine Corps general.
Ivo Brešan, 80, Croatian writer (How the War Started on My Island).
Mike Buchanan, 84, Canadian ice hockey player (Chicago Blackhawks).
Kevin Casey, 40, Irish broadcaster (WLR FM), cancer.
Charles J. Colgan, 90, American politician, member of the Virginia Senate (1976–2016), vascular ailment.
J. Dewey Daane, 98, American economist.
George M. Dennison, 81, American university administrator, President of the University of Montana (1990–2010), non-Hodgkin lymphoma.
Cecilia González Gómez, 55, Mexican politician, Deputy of Congress (2012–2015), heart attack.
Russ Gorman, 90, Australian politician, MHR for Chifley (1983–1984) and Greenway (1984–1996).
Shigeru Kōyama, 87, Japanese actor (Samurai Rebellion, Black Rain, Beyond Outrage), complications from pneumonia.
Gilberto Martínez, 82, Colombian Olympian 
Rolf Noskwith, 97, German-born British businessman and codebreaker (World War II).
Peter Pollen, 89, Canadian politician, Mayor of Victoria, British Columbia (1971–1975, 1981–1985).
H. S. Mahadeva Prasad, 58, Indian politician, MLA (since 1994), heart attack.
Rosemary Stevenson, 80, American baseball player (Grand Rapids Chicks).
Alan Surgal, 100, American screenwriter (Mickey One).
Igor Volk, 79, Ukrainian-born Russian cosmonaut and test pilot (Soyuz T-12).

4
Hisham Al-Otaibi, 70, Kuwaiti politician, Minister of Finance (1998–1999).
Heinz Billing, 102, German physicist and computer scientist.
William J. Cason, 92, American politician, member of the Missouri Senate (1960–1976).
John Cummings, 73, British politician, MP for Easington (1987–2010), lung cancer.
Willie Evans, 79, American football player (University at Buffalo).
Abdul Halim Jaffer Khan, 89, Indian sitar player and composer, cardiac arrest.
Bruce Hugo, 71, American politician, member of the Oregon House of Representatives (1983–1993).
Bade Fateh Ali Khan, 82, Pakistani singer, lung disease.
Sandra Landy, 78, British contract bridge player, meningitis.
Carl E. Misch, 69, American prosthodontist, cancer.
Jordi Pagans i Monsalvatje, 84, Spanish painter.
Ezio Pascutti, 79, Italian footballer (Bologna).
Art Pennington, 93, American baseball player (Chicago American Giants, Birmingham Black Barons).
Georges Prêtre, 92, French orchestral and opera conductor.
Lois Rice, 83, American business executive.
Milt Schmidt, 98, Canadian Hall of Fame ice hockey player, coach and general manager (Boston Bruins, Washington Capitals), stroke.
Anna Senkoro, 54, Tanzanian politician.
Gabriel Tang, 66, South Sudanese rebel leader, killed in Civil War.
Vlastimir Trajković, 69, Serbian composer.
Anthony Tu Shihua, 97, Chinese prelate from Chinese Patriotic Catholic Association, illegitimate Bishop of Hanyang (since 1959).
Veronica Steele, 69, Irish cheesemaker.
Sir Douglas Wass, 93, British civil servant, Permanent Secretary to HM Treasury (1974–1983).
Paul Went, 67, English footballer (Charlton Athletic, Leyton Orient, Portsmouth).
Wayne Westner, 55, South African golfer, suicide by gunshot.

5
David Alexander, 90, British Royal Marines general.
Graham Atkinson, 73, English footballer (Oxford United), cancer.
Spartak Belyaev, 93, Russian theoretical physicist.
Leonardo Benevolo, 93, Italian architect and city planner.
Géori Boué, 98, French operatic soprano.
Luc Coene, 69, Belgian economist.
Tullio De Mauro, 84, Italian linguist and politician, Minister of Education (2000–2001).
Paul Goble, 83, English-born American author and illustrator (Tipi: Home of the Nomadic Buffalo Hunters, The Girl Who Loved Wild Horses), Parkinson's disease.
Gangmumei Kamei, 77, Indian academic and politician.
Gerald E. McClearn, 89, American behavior geneticist.
Frank Murphy, 69, Irish Olympic middle-distance runner (1968, 1972), European Championship silver medalist (1969).
Alfonso Humberto Robles Cota, 85, Mexican Roman Catholic prelate, Bishop of Tepic (1981–2008).
Stanley Russ, 86, American politician, member of the Arkansas Senate (1975–2001), myeloid leukemia.
Jorge Sanguinetti, 82, Uruguayan politician, Minister of Transport (1985–1989).
Jill Saward, 51, British sexual assault awareness campaigner, subarachnoid haemorrhage.
Marzio Strassoldo, 77, Italian politician, President of the Province of Udine (2001–2007).
Rafiq Subaie, 86, Syrian actor, writer and director.
Harry Taylor, 81, English footballer (Newcastle United).
Christopher Weeramantry, 90, Sri Lankan judge, Vice-President of the International Court of Justice (1997–2000).
Peter Weston, 72, British science fiction fanzine editor, cancer.
Kurt Wigartz, 83, Swedish Olympic gymnast (1952, 1956, 1960).
John Wightman, 78, American politician, Mayor of Lexington, Nebraska (1992–1995), member of the Nebraska Legislature (2007–2015).

6
Yaron Ben-Dov, 46, Israeli footballer (Ironi Rishon LeZion, Maccabi Netanya, Hapoel Tel Aviv).
Audrey Grevious, 86, American civil rights activist.
Awad Moukhtar Halloudah, 85, Egyptian Olympic swimmer.
John Hubbard, 85, American-born British artist.
Greg Jelks, 55, American-Australian Olympic baseball player (2000), (Philadelphia Phillies).
Kosei Kamo, 84, Japanese tennis player, winner of the 1955 U.S. Open, heart attack.
Una Kroll, 91, British nun and Anglican priest.
Les Lazarowitz, 75, American sound mixer (Taxi Driver, Raging Bull, Groundhog Day), cancer.
Joseba Leizaola, 86, Spanish politician, President of the Basque Parliament (1990–1998).
Octavio Lepage, 93, Venezuelan politician, Acting President (1993).
Ivar A. Mjør, 83, Norwegian dental researcher.
Ramón Martínez Pérez, 87, Spanish footballer (Sevilla, Granada, national team).
Bayezid Osman, 92, Turkish royal, 44th Head of the Imperial House of Osman (since 2009).
Ghaith Pharaon, 76, Saudi businessman.
Ricardo Piglia, 75, Argentine author, amyotrophic lateral sclerosis.
Sylvester Potts, 78, American singer and composer (The Contours).
Om Puri, 66, Indian actor (Ardh Satya, City of Joy, East Is East), heart attack.
Bob Sadowski, 79, American baseball player (Los Angeles Angels, Chicago White Sox).
Tilikum, 35, American-held orca, subject of Blackfish, bacterial infection.
Gavin Whittaker, 46, Australian rugby league footballer (Canterbury Bulldogs, Gold Coast Chargers), stomach cancer.
Francine York, 80, American actress (Days of Our Lives, Batman, The Family Man), cancer.

7
Cheick Fantamady Camara, 57, Guinean film director (Il va pleuvoir sur Conakry).
Bill Champion, 69, American baseball player (Milwaukee Brewers, Philadelphia Phillies).
Lucina da Costa Gomez-Matheeuws, 87, Dutch Antillean politician, Prime Minister of the Netherlands Antilles (1977).
John Deely, 74, American philosopher, cancer.
Ramanuja Devanathan, 57, Indian Sanskrit scholar.
Refik Erduran, 88, Turkish playwright, columnist and writer.
Carlos Fernández Gondín, 78, Cuban politician, Minister of the Interior (since 2015).
Stein Gauslaa, 68, Norwegian journalist and civil servant.
Nat Hentoff, 91, American political philosopher, columnist and music critic (The Village Voice, Down Beat).
Eddie Kamae, 89, American ukuleleist (Sons of Hawaii).
Jerzy Kossela, 74, Polish guitarist and vocalist (Niebiesko-Czarni, Czerwone Gitary).
Lelio Lagorio, 91, Italian politician, President of Tuscany (1970–1978), Minister of Defence (1980–1983) and Sport and Spectacles (1983–1986).
Abdul Hafeez Lakho, 87, Pakistani lawyer.
Betty Lasky, 94, American film historian, pneumonia.
Mildred Meacham, 92, American baseball player (AAGBPL).
Mike Ovey, 58, British Anglican clergyman and academic administrator (Oak Hill College), heart attack.
Einfrid Perstølen, 99, Norwegian psychiatrist and language proponent.
Murray Ryan, 94, American politician, member of the New Mexico House of Representatives (1969–1999).
Michael Scanlan, 85, American Roman Catholic priest and academic administrator.
Sir Bruce Slane, 85, New Zealand public servant, Privacy Commissioner (1993–2003).
Mário Soares, 92, Portuguese politician, President (1986–1996) and Prime Minister (1976–1978, 1983–1985).
Lech Trzeciakowski, 85, Polish historian.
Alice Whitty, 82, Canadian Olympic high jumper (1956).
Laurel Woodcock, 56, Canadian artist and academic.

8
Dominique Appia, 90, Swiss painter.
Buddy Bregman, 86, American arranger, producer, and composer.
Jackie Brown, 73, American baseball player and coach (Texas Rangers).
James C. Christensen, 74, American fantasy artist, cancer.
Colin Cameron Davies, 92, Spanish-born Kenyan Roman Catholic prelate, Bishop of Ngong (1964–2002).
Jerry DeLucca, 80, American football player (Boston Patriots, Buffalo Bills, Philadelphia Eagles).
Klaib Al-Fawwaz, 66, Jordanian diplomat and politician, Minister of State for Cabinet Affairs (2011–2012).
Nicolai Gedda, 91, Swedish operatic tenor.
Miriam Goldberg, 100, American newspaper publisher (Intermountain Jewish News).
Mary Ann Green, 52–53, American tribal leader and politician, Chairperson of the Augustine Band of Cahuilla Indians (1988–2016).
Svennik Høyer, 85, Norwegian political scientist.
Roy Innis, 82, American civil rights activist, Parkinson's disease.
Elspeth Kennedy, 85, New Zealand sharebroker and community leader.
Abdulkadir Kure, 60, Nigerian politician, Governor of Niger State (1999–2007).
Sir James Mancham, 77, Seychellois politician, President (1976–1977).
Rod Mason, 76, British jazz trumpeter.
Jovanka Nikolić, 64, Serbian writer.
Zacharie Noah, 79, Cameroonian footballer (Stade Saint-Germain, Sedan-Torcy).
Ruth Perry, 77, Liberian politician, interim Head of State as Chairwoman of the Council of State (1996–1997).
Pioneer Cabin Tree, c.1000, American giant sequoia tree, storm damage.
Akbar Hashemi Rafsanjani, 82, Iranian politician, President (1989–1997).
Peter Sarstedt, 75, English singer-songwriter ("Where Do You Go To (My Lovely)?"), progressive supranuclear palsy.
Colin Shortis, 82, British army general.
Nigel Spearing, 86, British politician, MP for Acton (1970–1974) and Newham South (1974–1979), Alzheimer's disease.
Laurie Topp, 93, English footballer (Hendon).
Eli Zelkha, 66, Iranian-born American entrepreneur, inventor of ambient intelligence.

9
Qari Saifullah Akhtar, Pakistani Al-Qaeda militant.
Zygmunt Bauman, 91, Polish-British sociologist.
Jacques F. Benders, 92, Dutch mathematician.
Rodney H. Brady, 83, American businessman (Deseret Management Corporation) and academic administrator (Weber State University).
Charles Bragg, 85, American artist.
Roberto Cabañas, 55, Paraguayan footballer (New York Cosmos, Boca Juniors), cardiac arrest.
Michael Chamberlain, 72, New Zealand-born Australian pastor, exonerated in the death of Azaria Chamberlain, complications from leukaemia.
Crazy Toones, 45, American hip-hop record producer and DJ, heart attack.
Ugo Crescenzi, 86, Italian politician, first President of Abruzzo (1970–1972, 1973–1974), member of the Chamber of Deputies (1987–1992), kidney failure.
Ulf Dinkelspiel, 77, Swedish politician, Minister of European Affairs and Foreign Trade (1991–1994), cancer.
Patrick Flores, 87, American Roman Catholic prelate, Archbishop of San Antonio (1979–2004), pneumonia and heart failure.
Gerry Glaude, 89, Canadian ice hockey player (Chicoutimi Saguenéens).
Daan van Golden, 80, Dutch artist.
Mary Emily Gonsalves, 97, Pakistani Roman Catholic nun.
Jens Christian Magnus, 96, Norwegian politician and resistance activist.
Edward Margolies, 91, American author.
Bob McCullough, 85–86, Australian sports administrator, President of the Australian Paralympic Committee (1994–1996).
Terry Ramshaw, 74, English rugby league footballer (Featherstone Rovers, Wakefield Trinity).
John Sailhamer, 70, American evangelical Old Testament scholar, Parkinson's disease.
Teresa Ann Savoy, 61, British-born Italian actress (Caligula, Salon Kitty), cancer.
Ali Shariatmadari, 93, Iranian politician and academic, Minister of Culture (1979).
Warren Allen Smith, 95, American author, atheist, and gay-rights activist, signatory of Humanist Manifesto II.
Claude Steiner, 81, French-born American psychologist.
René Thomas, 88, Belgian biologist.
Russell Trood, 68, Australian politician and academic, Senator for Queensland (2005–2011), thyroid cancer.
Brown Turei, 92, New Zealand Anglican co-primate, Archbishop and Pihopa o Aotearoa (since 2006).
Timothy Well, 55, American professional wrestler (WWF, PNW, WCW), kidney failure.
T. K. Whitaker, 100, Irish economist and public servant.

10
Hiag Akmakjian, 91, American author, painter and photographer, lung cancer.
Horst Astroth, 93, German Olympic racewalker (1960).
Oddvar Barlie, 87, Norwegian Olympic sport wrestler (1960).
Ronald Buxton, 93, British politician, MP for Leyton (1965–1966).
Fernand Decanali, 91, French racing cyclist, Olympic champion (1948).
Leonard French, 88, Australian glass artist.
Steve Fryar, 63, American rodeo performer.
William Goodhart, Baron Goodhart, 83, British lawyer and politician.
Buddy Greco, 90, American singer, actor (The Girl Who Knew Too Much) and pianist.
Josef Grumser, 82, Austrian Olympic boxer.
Roman Herzog, 82, German politician, President (1994–1999), Judge of the Federal Constitutional Court (1983–1994).
Clare Hollingworth, 105, British journalist (The Daily Telegraph), broke news of German invasion of Poland.
Achmad Kurniawan, 37, Indonesian footballer (Arema Cronus), complications from a heart attack.
Claude Lebey, 93, French food critic.
Steven McDonald, 59, American police detective (NYPD), heart attack.
Ryszard Parulski, 78, Polish fencer, Olympic silver medalist (1964).
Võ Quý, 87, Vietnamese zoologist.
Manlio Rocchetti, 73, Italian make-up artist (Driving Miss Daisy, Lonesome Dove, Gangs of New York), Oscar and Emmy winner (1989).
Tony Rosato, 62, Italian-born Canadian actor (Saturday Night Live, SCTV, Night Heat), heart attack.
Oliver Smithies, 91, British-American geneticist, laureate of the Nobel Prize in Physiology or Medicine (2007).
Kenny Wharram, 83, Canadian ice hockey player (Chicago Blackhawks).

11
Tommy Allsup, 85, American rockabilly and swing guitarist, complications from hernia surgery.
Pierre Arpaillange, 92, French author, senior judge and politician, Minister of Justice (1988–1990).
Tony Booth, 83, British poster artist (The Beatles), cancer.
James Fairfax, 83, Australian business executive and philanthropist.
Peter Fenix, 77, South African cricketer.
James Ferguson-Lees, 88, British ornithologist (British Birds).
Brian Fletcher, 69, British jockey, winner of the Grand National (1968, 1973, 1974), cancer.
Henry Foner, 97, American social activist.
Katherine Fryer, 106, British artist.
Victor Griffin, 92, Irish Anglican clergyman and theologian.
Conrad Hilberry, 88, American poet, complications from cancer and pneumonia.
Mark Josephson, 73, American cardiologist, cancer.
Victor Lownes, 88, American businessman (Playboy).
Charles Lyell, 3rd Baron Lyell, 77, British peer.
Arthur Manuel, 66, Canadian Neskonlith chief, indigenous rights and environmental activist.
Nikolay Neprimerov, 95, Russian physicist.
Robert Pierre Sarrabère, 90, French Roman Catholic prelate, Bishop of Aire and Dax (1978–2002).
Adenan Satem, 72, Malaysian politician, Chief Minister of Sarawak (since 2014), heart attack.
Saeeduzzaman Siddiqui, 78, Pakistani jurist and politician, Governor of Sindh (since 2016).
Akio Takamori, 66, Japanese-born American sculptor, cancer.
François Van der Elst, 62, Belgian footballer (Anderlecht, West Ham United, national team), heart attack.
Christopher Chubasco Wilkins, 48, American murderer, execution by lethal injection.
Kenyon Wright, 84, Scottish Episcopal priest and political campaigner.

12
Giulio Angioni, 77, Italian writer (Le fiamme di Toledo, Assandira) and anthropologist.
Meir Banai, 55, Israeli singer, cancer.
Eduardo Blasco Ferrer, 60, Spanish-Italian linguist.
William Peter Blatty, 89, American novelist and screenwriter (The Exorcist, Legion, A Shot in the Dark), Oscar winner (1974), multiple myeloma.
Gerry Gersten, 89, American cartoonist.
Robin Hyman, 85, British publisher.
Anthony King, 82, Canadian-born British political scientist and commentator.
Milton Metz, 95, American radio and television host.
Karima Mokhtar, 82, Egyptian actress.
Vsevolod Murakhovsky, 90, Ukrainian-born Russian politician, First Deputy Premier of the Soviet Union (1985–1989).
Jill Roe, 76, Australian historian and academic.
Frank Spellman, 94, American weightlifter, Olympic champion (1948).
Martha Swope, 88, American photographer, Parkinson's disease.
Graham Taylor, 72, English football player and manager (Watford, Aston Villa, national team), heart attack.

13
Gilberto Agustoni, 94, Swiss Roman Catholic cardinal, Prefect of Apostolic Signatura (1992–1998).
Antony Armstrong-Jones, 1st Earl of Snowdon, 86, English photographer and filmmaker.
Walter Benz, 85, German mathematician.
Jerome A. Berson, 92, American chemist.
Hans Berliner, 87, German-born American computer scientist and chess player.
Bernard d'Abrera, 76, Australian entomologist.
Mark Fisher, 48, British writer, cultural theorist and music journalist (The Wire, Fact), suicide.
Dick Gautier, 85, American actor and singer (Get Smart, Transformers, When Things Were Rotten).
Horacio Guarany, 91, Argentine folkloric singer and writer, cardiac arrest.
Sir John Hanson, 78, British diplomat and historian.
Robert H. Hughes, 91, American politician.
Alan Jabbour, 74, American fiddler and folklorist (Library of Congress).
John Jacobs, 91, English golfer, founder of the PGA European Tour.
Zainuri Kamaruddin, 50, Malaysian Islamist militant, air strike.
Magic Alex, 74, Greek electronics engineer (The Beatles, Apple Electronics), complications from pneumonia.
David Modell, 56, American businessman (Baltimore Ravens), lung cancer.
Anton Nanut, 84, Slovenian conductor.
Albert H. Owens Jr., 90, American oncologist.
Ari Rath, 92, Austrian-born Israeli journalist (The Jerusalem Post).
Nicodemo Scarfo, 87, American mobster, boss of the Philadelphia crime family (1981–1991).
Fumiko Shiraga, 49, Japanese-German pianist, breast cancer.
Jan Stoeckart, 89, Dutch composer, conductor and trombonist.
Udo Ulfkotte, 56, German political scientist and journalist (Frankfurter Allgemeine Zeitung), heart attack.

14
Surjit Singh Barnala, 91, Indian politician, Chief Minister of Punjab (1985–1987), Governor of Uttarakhand (2000–2003) and Tamil Nadu (2004–2011).
John Boudreaux, 80, American drummer.
Barry Cassin, 92, Irish actor (Mystic Knights of Tir Na Nog, The Count of Monte Cristo, Byzantium).
Mohammed bin Faisal Al Saud, 80, Saudi royal and businessman.
Alex Jones, 75, American Roman Catholic deacon.
Eldar Kuliev, 65, Kyrgyz-born Russian screenwriter and author.
Herbert Mies, 87, German politician, Chairman of the Communist Party (1973–1989).
Deepal Silva, 49, Sri Lankan singer, heart attack.
Kevin Starr, 76, American historian and librarian, heart attack.
*Yama Buddha, 29, Nepalese rapper, suicide.
Yee Tit Kwan, 90, Singaporean Olympian 
Zhou Youguang, 111, Chinese linguist and supercentenarian, developed the pinyin romanization system.

15
Isidro Baldenegro López, 50, Mexican Rarámuri farmer and environmental leader, shot.
George Beall, 79, American attorney, prosecuted Spiro Agnew for corruption.
Ciel Bergman, 78, American painter.
Babette Cole, 66, English children's author.
Terry Cryer, 82, British jazz and blues photographer.
Roman Darowski, 81, Polish philosopher.
John Davis, 78, British anthropologist.
Richard Divall, 71, Australian conductor and musicologist.
Aleksandr Ezhevsky, 101, Soviet engineer and statesman.
Dermot Gallagher, 72, Irish civil servant and diplomat.
Luis Gámir, 74, Spanish politician, Minister of Trade and Tourism (1980).
Gorky González Quiñones, 77, Mexican potter.
Han Peixin, 95, Chinese politician, Governor of Jiangsu (1982–1983).
Kozo Kinomoto, 68, Japanese footballer and sports executive (Japan Football League), heart failure.
Thandi Klaasen, 85, South African jazz singer, pancreatic cancer.
Vicki Lansky, 75, American author and publisher, cirrhosis.
Eddie Long, 63, American pastor (New Birth Missionary Baptist Church), cancer.
Mieczyslaw Malinski, 93, Polish theologian.
Nasir al-Din Nasir Hunzai, 99, Pakistani writer and poet.
Erwin Obermair, 70, Austrian astronomer.
Paul C. Paris, 86, American metallurgist.
David Poythress, 73, American military officer and politician, Secretary of State of Georgia (1979–1983).
Robert Rodman, 76, American computer scientist, complications from inclusion body myositis.
Shutaro Shoji, 83, Japanese Olympic basketball player (1956, 1960).
Dale Smith, 88, American rodeo performer.
Jimmy Snuka, 73, Fijian-born American professional wrestler (WWF, AWA, PNW), stomach cancer.
Jan Szczepański, 77, Polish boxer, Olympic champion (1972).
Greg Trooper, 61, American singer-songwriter, pancreatic cancer.

16
Carolyn Allport, 66, Australian historian and trade unionist.
James R. Ambrose, 94, American aerospace executive (Ford Aerospace).
*Amin Nasir, 48, Singaporean football player (Woodlands Wellington, national team) and manager (Hougang United), colon cancer.
Gene Cernan, 82, American astronaut (Apollo 10, Apollo 17), last person to walk on the Moon.
Jack Eames, 94, Australian football player (Richmond).
Roland Glavany, 94, French army general.
Gerd Grochowski, 60, German opera singer.
Phyllis Harrison-Ross, 80, American psychiatrist, lung cancer.
William A. Hilliard, 89, American journalist (The Oregonian).
Franz Jarnach, 73, German actor (Dittsche) and keyboardist (The Rattles), heart attack.
Cuthbert Johnson, 70, British musician, liturgist and Benedictine abbot.
Peter Jones, 83, Australian politician, member of the Western Australian Legislative Assembly (1974–1986).
Kerry McNamara, 76, Namibian architect and political activist, cancer.
Jiří Navrátil, 93, Czech Scout leader, President of Junák.
Dan O'Brien Sr., 87, American baseball executive (Texas Rangers, Seattle Mariners, Cleveland Indians).
William Onyeabor, 70, Nigerian singer-songwriter.
Charles "Bobo" Shaw, 69, American jazz drummer.
C. V. Vishveshwara, 78, Indian physicist.
Brian Whitehouse, 81, English footballer (West Bromwich Albion, Crystal Palace).
Steve Wright, 66, American bass guitarist (The Greg Kihn Band), heart attack.

17
M. M. Ruhul Amin, 74, Bangladeshi judge, Chief Justice (2008–2009).
Brenda C. Barnes, 63, American businesswoman, CEO of PepsiCo (1996–1997) and Sara Lee (2005–2010), stroke.
Philip Bond, 82, British actor (Doctor Who, The Onedin Line).
David P. Buckson, 96, American lawyer and politician, Governor of Delaware (1960–1961).
Tirrel Burton, 86, American football player and coach (Michigan).
Colo, 60, American-bred western gorilla, oldest gorilla in captivity.
Mario Fasino, 96, Italian politician, President of Sicily (1969–1972), President of the Sicilian Regional Assembly (1974–1976).
Heng Freylinger, 90, Luxembourger wrestler, competitor at 1952 Summer Olympics.
Pascal Garray, 51, Belgian comics artist (Benoît Brisefer, The Smurfs).
Herbert Gauls, 86, German photographer.
Alenka Goljevšček, 85, Slovenian writer.
Tokio Kano, 82, Japanese politician, member of the House of Councillors (since 1998), heart failure.
Lucy Killea, 94, American politician, member of the California State Senate (1982–1996).
William Margold, 73, American pornographic actor and director.
Kenneth McNenny, 81, American politician, member of the South Dakota House of Representatives (1987–2000) and Senate (2005–2008).
Gene Olaff, 96, American soccer player (Brooklyn Hispano).
Malcolm Peat, 84, Canadian academic.
Steven Plaut, 65, American-born Israeli economist and academic.
Robert Timlin, 84, American federal judge, U.S. District Court for the Central District of California (since 1994).
Daniel Vischer, 67, Swiss politician, member of the National Council (2003–2015), cancer.

18
Peter Abrahams, 97, South African-born Jamaican writer (Mine Boy).
Red Adams, 95, American baseball player (Chicago Cubs) and coach (Los Angeles Dodgers).
María Nsué Angüe, 71–72, Equatorial Guinean writer and politician.
Yosl Bergner, 96, Austrian-born Israeli painter.
Ion Besoiu, 85, Romanian actor (Toate pînzele sus).
Obed Dlamini, 79, Swazi politician, Prime Minister (1989–1993).
Ed Dyck, 66, Canadian ice hockey player (Vancouver Canucks, Indianapolis Racers), cancer.
Ronan Fanning, 75, Irish historian, cancer.
Gullow Gjeseth, 79, Norwegian military officer.
Rachael Heyhoe Flint, Baroness Heyhoe Flint, 77, English cricketer (women's national team), businesswoman and philanthropist.
Zohurul Hoque, 90, Indian Islamic scholar.
Yuji Ijiri, 81, Japanese-born American accounting academic.
Jung Mikyung, 56, South Korean novelist.
Mike Kellie, 69, English drummer (Spooky Tooth, The Only Ones) and record producer.
Peter Kippax, 76, English cricketer (Yorkshire, MCC), Alzheimer's disease.
Hanns Kreisel, 85, German mycologist.
John Levee, 92, American painter.
André Léveillé, 83, Canadian politician.
John Little, 86, Canadian-born Scottish footballer (Rangers, Morton, Scotland national team).
Hubert Lucot, 81, French author.
Lawrence S. Margolis, 81, American judge, United States Court of Federal Claims (1982–1997).
Władysław Markiewicz, 97, Polish sociologist.
Harry Minor, 88, American baseball player and manager (New York Mets).
Ymer Pampuri, 72, Albanian Olympic weightlifter (1972).
Roberta Peters, 86, American coloratura soprano, Parkinson's disease.
David Spicer, 70, American organist.
Dick Starr, 95, American baseball player (St. Louis Browns).
Juan Thomas, 90, Spanish Olympic sports shooter.
Samuel Widmer, 69, Swiss physician, psychiatrist and psychotherapist (psycholytic therapy).
Ståle Wikshåland, 63, Norwegian musicologist, blood clot.

19
Jalal Allakhverdiyev, 87, Azerbaijani mathematician.
Hilary Bailey, 79, British writer.
Wayne Barrett, 71, American journalist (The Village Voice), lung cancer.
Loalwa Braz, 63, Brazilian singer-songwriter ("Lambada"), burns.
Thibaut Cuisset, 58, French photographer.
Miguel Ferrer, 61, American actor (RoboCop, Mulan, Twin Peaks), heart failure and complications of throat cancer.
Eddie Filgate, 101, Irish politician, TD (1977–1982).
Ralph F. Fiske, 85, Canadian politician, member of the Nova Scotia House of Assembly (1970–1974).
Roderick Ham, 91, British architect.
Craig Howard, 64, American football coach (Oregon Tech, Southern Oregon).
Roman Jarymowycz, 72, Austrian-born Canadian soldier and educator.
Rafael Kadyrov, 47, Russian ice hockey referee, brain tumor.
Jan Kruis, 83, Dutch cartoonist (Jack, Jacky and the Juniors).
Ger van Mourik, 85, Dutch footballer (Ajax).
Joyce Murland, 79, Canadian wheelchair athlete, Paralympic silver medalist (1972, 1976).
Paul Ornstein, 92, Hungarian-born American psychoanalyst.
Edwin Pope, 88, American journalist (The Miami Herald, Athens Banner-Herald), cancer.
Walt Streuli, 81, American baseball player (Detroit Tigers).
Guillaume Van Tongerloo, 83, Belgian Olympic cyclist.
Giovanni Vastola, 78, Italian footballer (Vicenza, Bologna).
James S. Vlasto, 82, American public servant.
H. Boyd Woodruff, 99, American microbiologist.
Teori Zavascki, 68, Brazilian Supreme Court judge, Operation Car Wash reporter, plane crash.

20
Bruno Amoroso, 80, Italian-born Danish economist.
Robert Anker, 70, Dutch writer.
José Luis Astigarraga Lizarralde, 76, Spanish-born Peruvian Roman Catholic prelate, Vicar Apostolic of Yurimaguas (1991–2016).
Jack August, 63, American historian, specialist in the history of Arizona, liver failure.
Leendert Bosch, 92, Dutch biochemist.
Hans Breukhoven, 70, Dutch businessman, founder of the Free Record Shop, pancreatic cancer.
Joy Coghill, 90, Canadian actress (Da Vinci's Inquest), heart failure.
Bill Fischer, 89, American football player (Chicago Cardinals).
Ahmed Gailani, 84, Afghan Qadiriyya leader and politician, founded National Islamic Front of Afghanistan.
Michael Goldberg, 73, American sports executive (NBCA).
Judith Palache Gregory, 84, American writer.
Klaus Huhn, 88, German sports journalist and writer.
Naděžda Kavalírová, 93, Czech political prisoner and activist, head of the Institute for the Study of Totalitarian Regimes (2007–2013).
Alec Devon Kreider, 25, American convicted murderer, suicide by hanging.
Charles Liteky, 85, American military chaplain and peace activist.
Harry J. Middleton, 95, American writer and library director.
Joey Powers, 82, American singer-songwriter.
Czesław Rajtar, 87, Polish footballer 
Sergio Reolon, 65, Italian politician.
Colin Rushmere, 79, South African conservationist and cricketer.
Carlos Alberto Silva, 77, Brazilian football manager (Guarani, Porto, national team).
Chuck Stewart, 89, American jazz photographer.
Tommy Tate, 72, American soul singer and songwriter.
Emma Tennant, 79, British author, posterior cortical atrophy.
Frank Thomas, 80, French songwriter.
John Watkiss, 55, British comic artist (Deadman) and concept artist (Tarzan, Atlantis: The Lost Empire), cancer.

21
Marc Baecke, 60, Belgian footballer (Beveren, national team).
Alexinia Baldwin, 91, American educator.
Biruta Baumane, 94, Latvian artist.
Mark Baumer, 33, American environmental activist, traffic collision.
Erika Böhm-Vitense, 93, German-born American astronomer.
Byron Dobell, 89, American editor and writer, complications from Parkinson's disease.
Bernd Drechsel, 63, German Olympic wrestler (1972).
Jamshid Giunashvili, 86, Georgian linguist and Iranologist.
Vahit Melih Halefoğlu, 97, Turkish diplomat, Minister of Foreign Affairs (1983–1987).
Yuri Karash, 53, Russian journalist, heart attack.
José de Jesús Madera Uribe, 89, American Roman Catholic prelate, Bishop of Fresno (1980–1991) and Auxiliary Bishop for the Military Services, USA (1991–2004).
Hiroki Matsukata, 74, Japanese actor (Battles Without Honor and Humanity, Shogun's Samurai), complications from lymphoma.
Walter "Junie" Morrison, 62, American Hall of Fame musician (Ohio Players, Parliament-Funkadelic) and record producer.
William Albert Norris, 89, American judge, United States Court of Appeals for the Ninth Circuit (1980–1994).
Shirley Paget, Marchioness of Anglesey, 92, British public servant and writer.
Ernst Petzold, 87, German theologian.
Maggie Roche, 65, American singer-songwriter (The Roches), cancer.
Francesco Saverio Salerno, 88, Italian Roman Catholic prelate, Secretary of Apostolic Signatura (1998–2003).
Dave Shipperley, 64, English footballer (Charlton Athletic, Gillingham).
Harry E. T. Thayer, 89, American diplomat, Ambassador to Singapore (1980–1985), Director of the American Institute in Taiwan (1984–1986).
Veljo Tormis, 86, Estonian composer.
Ken Wright, 70, American baseball player (Kansas City Royals).

22
Merete Armand, 61, Norwegian actress.
J. S. G. Boggs, 62, American artist.
Pietro Bottaccioli, 88, Italian Roman Catholic prelate, Bishop of Gubbio (1989–2004).
Dan Caspi, 71, Romanian-born Israeli media theorist and academic.
İlhan Cavcav, 81, Turkish football executive, chairman of Gençlerbirliği S.K. (since 1978), brain hemorrhage.
Chen Yu-mei, 50, Taiwanese politician.
Giovanni Corrieri, 96, Italian bicycle racer.
Søren Elung Jensen, 88, Danish actor (Det støver stadig, King Lear), lung cancer.
Cristina Adela Foișor, 49, Romanian chess player, International Master.
Jean Georgakarakos, 76, French music producer.
Moshe Gershuni, 80, Israeli painter and sculptor.
Aleksander Kan, 91, Russian-born Swedish historian.
Evelyn Kawamoto, 83, American swimmer, Olympic bronze medalist (1952).
Lisbeth Korsmo, 69, Norwegian speed skater, Olympic bronze medalist (1976).
Jaki Liebezeit, 78, German drummer (Can), pneumonia.
Naqsh Lyallpuri, 88, Indian poet and songwriter.
Katharine Macmillan, Viscountess Macmillan of Ovenden, 96, British politician and aristocrat.
Andy Marte, 33, Dominican baseball player (Atlanta Braves, Cleveland Indians, Arizona Diamondbacks), traffic collision.
Masaya Nakamura, 91, Japanese businessman, founder of Namco.
Lev Navrozov, 88, Russian writer, historian and dissident.
Werner Nekes, 72, German film director.
Glenn D. Paige, 87, American political scientist.
Francisco Palmeiro, 84, Portuguese footballer (Benfica).
József Torgyán, 84, Hungarian politician, Minister of Agriculture (1998–2001).
Alexis S. Troubetzkoy, 82, Russian writer and educator.
Yordano Ventura, 25, Dominican baseball player (Kansas City Royals), traffic collision.
Pete Overend Watts, 69, English bass guitarist (Mott the Hoople), throat cancer.
Rudolf Wille, 79, German mathematician.

23
Volodymyr Bezkorovainy, 72, Ukrainian vice admiral, Commander of the Navy (1993–1996).
Bimba Bosé, 41, Italian-born Spanish model, designer, singer and actress (El cónsul de Sodoma), breast cancer.
Kay Cornelius, 84, American novelist.
Preben Dabelsteen, 91, Danish badminton player, Thomas Cup silver medalist (1949).
Earl Foreman, 92, American lawyer and sports executive (Washington Whips, Virginia Squires, Major Indoor Soccer League).
Bobby Freeman, 76, American singer and songwriter ("Do You Want to Dance"), heart attack.
Dmytro Grabovskyy, 31, Ukrainian bicycle racer, heart attack.
Ralph Guglielmi, 83, American football player (Washington Redskins, New York Giants).
Ted Haggis, 92, Canadian sprinter.
Mustafa Imamović, 76, Bosnian historian.
Kang Ki-sop, North Korean politician, Director of General Civil Aviation Administration (since 2010). (death announced on this date)
Leon Katz, 97, American playwright.
Gorden Kaye, 75, English actor ('Allo 'Allo!, Brazil, Coronation Street), kidney failure.
Kudditji Kngwarreye, 78, Australian Aboriginal artist.
Erland Kolding Nielsen, 70, Danish academic, Director General of the Royal Library.
Leslie Koo, 62, Taiwanese business executive (Taiwan Cement Corporation), fall.
Boško Krunić, 87, Serbian politician (League of Communists of Yugoslavia), Chairman of the Presidium (1987–1988).
Li Kwan-ha, 79, Hong Kong police officer, Commissioner of the Royal Hong Kong Police (1989–1994), fall.
Bernard Redmont, 98, American journalist.
Douglas Reeman, 92, British author.
Anatol Roshko, 93, Canadian-born American physicist and engineer.
Ruth Samuelson, 57, American politician, member of the North Carolina General Assembly (2007–2015), ovarian cancer.
David Sayer, 80, English cricketer (Kent).
Franz Schelle, 87, German Olympic bobsledder (1956, 1964).
Betty Tebbs, 98, British women's rights activist.
Andrew Telegdi, 70, Hungarian-born Canadian politician, MP for Waterloo (1993–2008).
Marvell Thomas, 75, American keyboardist.
Serhiy Tovstoplet, 79, Ukrainian Olympic swimmer (1960).
Jaroslav Vacek, 73, Czech Indologist.
Herman Vanden Berghe, 83, Belgian geneticist.
Mary Webster, 81, American actress (The Delicate Delinquent, The Tin Star, Master of the World).
G. A. Wells, 90, British professor of German.

24
Dan Adamescu, 68, Romanian businessman (Unirea Shopping Center).
Fred André, 75, Dutch football player and manager (Telstar).
Chuck Canfield, 84, American businessman and politician, Mayor of Rochester, Minnesota (1996–2003).
Lualemaga Faoa, American Samoan judge and politician, Paramount Chief of Aasu, Governor of Western District (since 2013).
Robert Folsom, 89, American politician, Mayor of Dallas, Texas (1976–1981).
Martin Nicholas Lohmuller, 97, American Roman Catholic prelate, Auxiliary Bishop of Philadelphia (1970–1994).
Manu Maniapoto, 81, New Zealand rugby union player (Bay of Plenty, Māori national team).
Porfirio Méndez, 50, Paraguayan Olympic athlete.
Gil Ray, 60, American drummer (Game Theory, The Loud Family), cancer.
Butch Trucks, 69, American drummer (The Allman Brothers Band), suicide by gunshot.
Carlos Verdejo, 82, Chilean footballer (Santiago Wanderers).
Chuck Weyant, 93, American racecar driver.
Adlyn White, 87, Jamaican religious leader.
Peter Woodman, 73, Irish archaeologist.

25
Arne Asper, 93, Norwegian businessman.
William Lacy Carter, 91, American politician, member of the Tennessee House of Representatives (1970–1974).
Stephen P. Cohen, 71, Canadian academic, male breast cancer.
Ann Dandrow, 80, American politician, member of the Connecticut House of Representatives (1986–2002).
Ronnie Davis, 66, Jamaican reggae singer.
Đinh Xuân Lâm, 91, Vietnamese educator and historian.
Buchi Emecheta, 72, Nigerian novelist (The Bride Price, The Joys of Motherhood, Gwendolen).
Charles Reis Felix, 93, American writer.
Shunji Fujimura, 82, Japanese actor (Monkey, Death Note, Black Butler), heart failure.
Robert Garcia, 84, American politician, member of the U.S. House of Representatives from New York's 21st congressional district (1978–1990), emphysema-induced infection.
Kevin Geer, 64, American actor (Twelve Angry Men, The Pelican Brief, The Contender), heart attack.
Sir John Hurt, 77, British actor (Alien, The Elephant Man, Hellboy), BAFTA winner (1979, 1981), pancreatic cancer.
Jun Izumida, 51, Japanese professional wrestler (AJPW, Pro Wrestling Noah), heart attack.
Katja of Sweden, 97, Swedish fashion designer.
Nicolae Lupan, 95, Moldovan author and journalist.
Harry Mathews, 86, American novelist and poet.
Jack Mendelsohn, 90, American cartoonist and screenwriter (Yellow Submarine, Rowan & Martin's Laugh-In, Teenage Mutant Ninja Turtles), lung cancer.
Mary Tyler Moore, 80, American actress (The Dick Van Dyke Show, The Mary Tyler Moore Show, Ordinary People), 7-time Emmy winner, cardiopulmonary arrest.
Jacques Moreau, 83, French politician, MEP (1979–1984).
Siewert Öholm, 77, Swedish journalist and television presenter, liver cancer.
Arturo Pérez de Alejo Rodríguez, 66, Cuban dissident.
Mike Peyton, 96, British cartoonist.
Ivan Pritargov, 64, Bulgarian footballer (Chernomorets Burgas, CSKA Sofia, national team), stroke.
Marcel Prud'homme, 82, Canadian politician, MP (1964–1993) and Senator (1993–2009).
Sir Nigel Rodley, 75, British human rights professor and lawyer.
Raúl Valerio, 90, Mexican actor.
Margaret Wall, Baroness Wall of New Barnet, 75, British trade unionist and peer.

26
Ramdas Agarwal, 79, Indian politician.
Bakhti Belaïb, 64, Algerian politician, Minister of Trade (1996–1999, and since 2015), cancer.
Anne-Marie Colchen, 91, French track and field athlete and basketball player, European high jump champion (1946) and basketball world championship bronze medalist (1953).
Saloua Raouda Choucair, 100, Lebanese painter and sculptor.
Mike Connors, 91, American actor (Mannix, The Ten Commandments, Tightrope!), leukemia.
Sir Tam Dalyell, 84, Scottish politician, MP for West Lothian (1962–1983) and Linlithgow (1983–2005), Father of the House (2001–2005).
Lindy Delapenha, 89, Jamaican football player (Middlesbrough) and sports broadcaster.
Martin Froy, 90, British painter.
Hal Geer, 100, American producer and filmmaker (Looney Tunes).
Raynald Guay, 83, Canadian politician, MP (1963–1980).
Barbara Hale, 94, American actress (Perry Mason, Airport, The Window), complications from COPD.
Barbara Howard, 96, Canadian sprinter and educator.
Montserrat Julió, 87, Spanish film and television actress (A Land for All).
Alexander Kadakin, 67, Russian diplomat, Ambassador to India (1999–2004, since 2009), heart failure.
Leonard Linkow, 90, American dentist.
Paul Lanneau, 91, Belgian Roman Catholic prelate, Auxiliary Bishop of Mechelen-Brussels (1982–2002).
Peter Lynch, 52, Australian mining engineer, plane crash.
David Mantell, 82, English cricketer (Sussex).
J. Kenyon Mason, 97, British medical and legal scholar.
Fred Parslow, 84, Australian stage and television actor (Alvin Purple).
Mario Quintero, 93, Cuban Olympic basketball player (1948, 1952).
Luciano Ravaglia, 94, Italian engineer.
Charles Recher, 66, American artist, stroke.
David Rose, 92, British television producer (Z-Cars), founder of FilmFour.
Dame Laurie Salas, 94, New Zealand women's rights and peace activist.
Miikka Toivola, 67, Finnish footballer (HJK Helsinki, national team).
Michael Tönnies, 57, German footballer (MSV Duisburg).

27
Pierre Albertini, 75, French Olympic judoka.
Wim Anderiesen Jr., 85, Dutch footballer (Ajax).
Valery Bolotov, 46, Russian-born Ukrainian militant leader, Head of the Lugansk People's Republic (2014).
Stan Boreson, 91, American comedian and television host.
Bob Bowman, 86, American baseball player (Philadelphia Phillies).
Henry-Louis de La Grange, 92, French musicologist, biographer of Gustav Mahler.
Gwen Gillen, 76, American sculptor, dementia.
Wanda Hjort Heger, 95, Norwegian resistance activist.
Bob Holiday, 84, American actor (It's a Bird...It's a Plane...It's Superman).
Atanas Kirov, 70, Bulgarian weightlifter, world champion (1973, 1974, 1975).
Ján Kobezda, 41, Slovak ice hockey player and coach (HK Dukla Trenčín), heart attack.
Petr Kop, 79, Czech volleyball player, Olympic silver medalist (1964).
Robert Ellis Miller, 89, American film director (Reuben, Reuben, The Heart Is a Lonely Hunter, Any Wednesday).
Yevdokiya Pasko, 97, Russian military officer and pilot, Hero of the Soviet Union.
Brunhilde Pomsel, 106, German broadcaster and secretary to Joseph Goebbels.
Geoffrey Raisman, 77, British neuroscientist.
Tatiana Repeikina, 43, Russian footballer (Ryazan VDV, Zvezda Perm).
Emmanuelle Riva, 89, French actress (Amour, Thérèse Desqueyroux, Hiroshima mon amour), BAFTA winner (2013), cancer.
Arthur H. Rosenfeld, 90, American physicist.
Charles Shackleford, 50, American basketball player (New Jersey Nets, Philadelphia 76ers).
Billy Simpson, 87, Northern Irish footballer (Linfield, Rangers).
Gisella Sofio, 85, Italian actress (Accidents to the Taxes!!, La liceale, The Big Heart of Girls).
Betty Stanhope-Cole, 79, Canadian golfer, cancer.
Jack Thrasher, 78–79, American immunotoxicologist.
Frank Tidy, 84, English cinematographer (The Duellists, Under Siege, Chain Reaction), dementia.

28
Kazem Afrandnia, 71, Iranian actor, stroke.
Mohammed Bello Abubakar, 93, Nigerian Muslim preacher and polygamist.
Sir Christopher Bland, 78, British-Irish  businessman, Chairman of the BBC (1996–2001), and Olympic fencer, prostate cancer.
Jean Bogaerts, 92, Belgian racing cyclist.
Edgar Britt, 103, Australian jockey.
Iain D. Campbell, 53, British religious leader (Free Church of Scotland), suicide by hanging.
Renzo Canestrari, 92, Italian psychiatrist.
Alexander Chancellor, 77, British journalist (The Spectator).
Lubomír Doležel, 94, Czech literary theorist.
Sabine Eggerth, 73, German actress.
Jaakko Elo, 91, Finnish urologist.
Guitar Gable, 79, American blues musician.
Sang Chul Lee, 92, Canadian Christian minister, Moderator of the United Church of Canada (1988–1990).
Charles LeMaistre, 92, American academic administrator, Chancellor of University of Texas System (1971–1978).
Many Clouds, 9, Irish-bred British-trained racehorse, Grand National winner (2015), pulmonary haemorrhage.
John N. Mather, 74, American mathematician.
Bharati Mukherjee, 76, Indian-born American writer (Jasmine) and academic, complications from rheumatoid arthritis and takotsubo cardiomyopathy.
Sterling Newberry, 101, American inventor.
Geoff Nicholls, 68, English keyboardist (Black Sabbath, Quartz), lung cancer.
Lennart Nilsson, 94, Swedish photographer.
Anthony J. Perpich, 84, American politician, member of the Minnesota Senate (1967–1976).
Richard Portman, 82, American sound mixer (The Godfather, Star Wars, The Deer Hunter), Oscar winner (1979), complications from a fall.
Günter Ropohl, 77, German philosopher of technology.
William Schwarzer, 91, American federal judge.
Thomas Joseph Simpson, 95, Canadian World War II veteran.
Dan Spiegle, 96, American comic book artist (Hopalong Cassidy, Scooby-Doo, Jonah Hex).
John J. Stamos, 92, American judge.
Darryl Sutton, 64, Australian VFL footballer (North Melbourne), pneumonia.
Salvatore Tatarella, 69, Italian politician, MEP (1994–1999).
Alexander Tikhanovich, 64, Belarusian pop singer (Verasy).
Stuart Timmons, 60, American gay historian and activist, cardiac arrest.
Ion Ungureanu, 81, Moldovan actor (That Sweet Word: Liberty!) and politician, MP (1990–1994).

29
Sir Harold Atcherley, 98, British businessman and arts administrator.
Ruslan Barburoș, 38, Moldovan footballer (Sheriff).
Oscar Bolaño, 65, Colombian footballer.
Pat Corr, 89, Northern Irish footballer.
Edmund Eiden, 95, American football player (Detroit Lions).
Willy Fossli, 85, Norwegian footballer (Asker).
Harald Friedrich, 69, German physicist.
Joop Gouweleeuw, 76, Dutch Olympic judoka (1964).
Joseph Mélèze-Modrzejewski, 86, Polish-French historian.
Howard Frank Mosher, 74, American author (Where the Rivers Flow North), cancer.
Ko Ni, 64, Burmese lawyer, shot.
Boris Nikolov, 87, Bulgarian boxer, Olympic bronze medalist (1952).
William Owens, 36, American Navy SEAL soldier, shot.
Stanislaw Padewski, 84, Polish-Ukrainian Roman Catholic prelate, Bishop of Kharkiv-Zaporizhia (2002–2009).
Leonard H. Perroots, 83, American military officer, Director of the Defense Intelligence Agency (1985–1988).
Michael Rainey, 76, Australian-born British fashion designer.
Elkin Ramírez, 54, Colombian singer-songwriter (Kraken), brain cancer.
Mario Reading, 63, British writer and translator, cancer.
Olav Smidsrød, 80, Norwegian biochemist.
Elliot Sperling, 66, American historian.

30
Dore Ashton, 89, American writer and critic.
Marta Becket, 92, American dancer.
Winnett Boyd, 100, Canadian engineer.
Don Coleman, 88, American football player (Michigan State).
Carmen Contreras-Bozak, 97, American World War II veteran, first Puerto Rican woman to serve in the Women's Army Corps.
Eiður Svanberg Guðnason, 77, Icelandic politician and diplomat, Ambassador to Australia (2003–2007).
Walter Hautzig, 95, Austrian-born American pianist.
Gilbert Henderson, 90, Canadian Olympic sports shooter (1960).
Doris Lockness, 106, American aviation pioneer.
Aito Mäkinen, 90, Finnish film director (Onnelliset leikit).
Mario R. Ramil, 70, Filipino-born American justice, Associate Justice of the Hawaii State Supreme Court (1993–2002), cancer.
Cesar C. Raval, 92, Filipino Roman Catholic prelate, Bishop of Bangued (1988–1992).
Harold Rosen, 90, American electrical engineer, complications from a stroke.
Johnny Wahlqvist, 43, Swedish powerlifter, heart illness.

31
Konstantin Arsenović, 76, Serbian politician and military official.
Thomas Barlow, 76, American politician, member of the U.S. House of Representatives from Kentucky's 1st congressional district (1993–1995).
Grethe Bartram, 92, Danish war criminal.
John Beasley, 86, Australian racing cyclist.
Matilde Capuis, 104, Italian organist, pianist and composer.
Trice Harvey, 80, American politician, member of the California State Assembly (1986–1996), injuries sustained in a fall.
*Kang Bong-kyun, 74, South Korean politician, Minister of Finance (1999–2000).
Deke Leonard, 72, Welsh rock guitarist (Man).
Paul McBlane, 53, Australian rugby league referee, heart attack.
Jim Mitchener, 87, Canadian football player.
Frank Pellegrino, 72, American actor (Goodfellas, The Sopranos) and restaurateur (Rao's), lung cancer.
Annie Saumont, 89, French author and translator.
John Schroeder, 82, British composer, songwriter and record producer (Helen Shapiro, Sounds Orchestral, Status Quo).
David Shepard, 76, American film preservationist.
Rob Stewart, 37, Canadian filmmaker (Sharkwater), drowned.
Bobby Watson, 86, American basketball player (Kentucky Wildcats, Minneapolis Lakers, Milwaukee Hawks).
John Wetton, 67, British singer-songwriter ("Only Time Will Tell", "Heat of the Moment") and bass guitarist (Asia, King Crimson), colorectal cancer.
Tokitenkū Yoshiaki, 37, Mongolian sumo wrestler, lymphoma.

References

2017-01
 01